Daniella Margarita Álvarez Vásquez (born May 24, 1988 in Barranquilla) is a Colombian model and beauty pageant titleholder who holds the title of Miss Colombia 2011 and represented Colombia at Miss Universe 2012. In June 2020, complications in her left leg meant that it had to be amputated below the knee. She's of  Spanish and Italian descent.

Pageant participation

Miss Colombia 2011
In 2011 Daniella, representing the Caribbean coastal department of Atlantico, was the winner of the Miss Colombia pageant, which was held in the historical city of Cartagena De Indias. She was crowned on November 14 by outgoing titleholder, Catalina Robayo Vargas, Miss Colombia 2010. Daniella got the highest score of 9.6 in the evening gown competition. (The swimsuit scores have not been published to the public.) She became the 10th woman to be crowned Miss Colombia from her department, Atlantico, thus making it the most successful department, followed closely by Valle with 9 crowns and Santander with 7 crowns.

Miss Universe 2012
Daniella Álvarez represented Colombia in the 61st Miss Universe contest, which was held in Las Vegas in 2012, but did not make the Top 16.

Personal life
As of 2021, she was dating actor Daniel Arenas.

See also 
 Miss Colombia 2011
 Miss Universe 2012

References

External links
Official Miss Colombia website 
Miss Colombia 2012 

1988 births
Living people
Miss Universe 2012 contestants
Colombian beauty pageant winners
Colombian people of Italian descent
Colombian female models
Colombian amputees
Miss Colombia winners